HMS Springbok was an  destroyer which served with the Royal Navy during World War I. The R class were an improvement on the preceding , including using geared steam turbines. Launched on 9 March 1917, the vessel operated as part of the Harwich Force on escort duties. In 1917, the destroyer, along with sister ship , captured the German merchant ships Brietzig and  Pellworm. After the conflict, the destroyer initially was posted to the navy's torpedo school but was soon afterwards reduced to reserve. After less than ten years in service, Springbok was sold on 16 December 1926 and broken up.

Design and development

Springbok was one of eight  destroyers ordered by the British Admiralty on 21 December 1915 as part of the Seventh War Construction Programme. The design was generally similar to the preceding  destroyers, but differed in having geared steam turbines, the central gun mounted on a bandstand and minor changes to improve seakeeping.

Three funnels were fitted.

Armament consisted of three  Mk IV QF guns on the ship's centreline, with one on the forecastle, one aft on a raised platform and one between the funnels, and a single 2-pounder (40 mm) pom-pom anti-aircraft gun. Torpedo armament was four  torpedo tubes in two twin rotating mounts aft, initially complemented by two  tubes mounted either side of the superstructure. Soon into service, the two smaller calibre torpedoes were removed as they proved ineffectual. The ship had a complement of 82 officers and ratings.

Construction and career
Springbok was laid down by Harland and Wolff at Belfast with yard number 497. Construction was very swift, with the keel laid down on 27 January 1916, launching on 9 March 1917 and fitting out completed on 30 April. The ship was named after the springbok, the African antelope Antidorcas marsupialis.

On commissioning, Springbok joined the 10th Destroyer Flotilla as part of the Harwich Force under the flotilla leader . On 4 June, Springbok formed part of the support for the bombardment of Ostend on 5 June 1917. This minefield may have caused the loss of the German submarine UC-1, which departed from Zeebrugge on 18 July and failed to return from a mission to lay mines off Calais. Meanwhile, on 15 July, Springbok had captured, along with Thruster, the Hamburg-registered merchant ships S.S. Brietzig and  Pellworm, furnishing the captured ships with prize crews.

After the war, the destroyer was allocated to the torpedo school at Nore. However, this posting did not last long and the vessel was reduced to reserve on 22 May 1919. In 1923, the Royal Navy decided to scrap many of the older destroyers in preparation for the introduction of newer and larger vessels. After less than ten years in service, the destroyer was sold on 16 December 1926 at Granton, Edinburgh and broken up.

Pennant numbers

References

Citations

Bibliography

 
 
 
 
 
 
 
 
 
 
 

1917 ships
R-class destroyers (1916)
Ships built in Belfast
World War I destroyers of the United Kingdom